The ribbon eel (Rhinomuraena quaesita), also known as the leaf-nosed moray eel or bernis eel, is a species of moray eel, the only member of the genus Rhinomuraena. What is now known as R. quaesita also includes the former R. amboinensis. R. quaesita was used for blue ribbon eels and R. amboinensis for black ribbon eels, but these are now recognized as the same species.  The ribbon eel is found in lagoons and reefs in the Indo-Pacific ocean, ranging from East Africa to southern Japan, Australia and French Polynesia. This species is widely distributed and is frequently seen by divers in Indonesian waters with their heads and anterior bodies protruding from crevices in sand and rubble habitats from very shallow to about 60 m. Although generally placed in the moray eel family Muraenidae, it has several distinctive features leading some to place it in its own family, Rhinomuraenidae.

The ribbon eel bears a resemblance to a mythical Chinese dragon with a long, thin body and high dorsal fins. The ribbon eel can easily be recognised by its expanded anterior nostrils. They are well known for their characteristic jaws that are frequently opened very widely when a diver approaches Based on observed colour changes, it is generally considered a protandric hermaphrodite (first male, then changing sex to female), although this has yet to be confirmed. Colour change related to sex change is not known from any other moray eel species. The presumed juveniles and subadults are jet black with a yellow dorsal fin, in adult males the black is replaced by blue, and adult females are entirely yellow or yellow with some blue to the posterior. In captivity, the colour differences are not related to maturity or sex.

In the aquarium
 
Because most ribbon eels do not live longer than a month in captivity, some feel that this species should never be purchased except for people with experience in keeping morays in captivity. Ribbon eels have been observed in many cases to stop eating after being captured, although there are reports of them surviving and eating in captivity for two years or more. Higher levels of success have been achieved in public aquaria, where there are a few reported cases of spawning at facilities in Europe and North America.

Although captured for the aquarium industry, it remains common and widespread, and is not considered threatened.

References

External links

Muraenidae

Fish described in 1888